William Eugene Murphy (born May 7, 1944) is a former Major League Baseball outfielder.  He played in 84 games for the New York Mets in 1966, mostly as a center fielder and a pinch hitter.  He had a batting average of .230 in 135 at bats, with 3 home runs and 13 runs batted in.

Murphy signed with the New York Yankees as an amateur free agent in 1962.  He was drafted by the Mets after the 1965 season in the Rule 5 Draft, after four seasons in the Yankees minor league system.

References

External links
Career statistics and player information from: 
Baseball Reference
Baseball Reference (Minors)
Retrosheet
Venezuelan Professional Baseball League

1944 births
African-American baseball players
Arkansas Travelers players
Baseball players from Louisiana
Binghamton Triplets players
Florida Instructional League Cardinals players
Florida Instructional League Red Sox players
Florida Instructional League Yankees players
Fort Lauderdale Yankees players
Greensboro Yankees players
Harlan Smokies players
Idaho Falls Yankees players
Jacksonville Suns players
Leones del Caracas players
American expatriate baseball players in Venezuela
Living people
Major League Baseball outfielders
New York Mets players
People from Pineville, Louisiana
Portland Beavers players
Seattle Angels players
Tacoma Cubs players
Tulsa Oilers (baseball) players
21st-century African-American people
20th-century African-American sportspeople
Sportspeople from Rapides Parish, Louisiana